The Juniors Riga were an ice hockey team in Riga, Latvia. They played in the Latvian Hockey Higher League and the Eastern European Hockey League.

History
The Juniors Riga were founded in 1993 and first took part in the Latvian Hockey Higher League. With the establishment of the East European Hockey League in 1996, the Juniors were included in this multinational league, and finished runner-up in their first season. They joined the LHL for the semifinals this year. A year later, Juniors Riga were EEHL champions by defeating Sokil Kiev in five games.

They participated in the 1997–98 IIHF Continental Cup.

Before the 1997-98 season, the team found a new sponsor, so they were renamed Essamika Juniors Riga. They finished fourth in the EEHL.

Due to financial problems, an affiliation with LB Prizma Riga was set up for 1998. The affiliate played in the LHL as LB/Essamika/Juniors-82 Riga.

The club folded after the 1999-00 season, in which they participated in the Latvian Hockey League and the EEHL Division B.

Notable players
 Ģirts Ankipāns
 Armands Bērziņš
 Edijs Brahmanis
 Raitis Ivanāns
 Vladimirs Mamonovs
 Sergejs Višegorodcevs
 Jānis Sprukts
 Jēkabs Rēdlihs

References
1996-97 EEHL season
1999-00 Latvian Hockey League season

Ice hockey teams in Riga
Defunct ice hockey teams in Latvia
Latvian Hockey League teams
Eastern European Hockey League teams
Ice hockey clubs established in 1993
Sports clubs disestablished in 2000